Andrew James West (born November 22, 1983) is an American actor. He is best known for his portrayal of Fisher in the ABC Family comedy drama Greek, and as Gareth in the AMC horror drama The Walking Dead. He appeared as a guest star in the fourth-season finale, and was promoted to a series regular for the fifth season. His performance earned him a Saturn Award for Best Guest Starring Role on Television nomination. He also portrayed older Henry Mills on ABC's Once Upon a Time.

Personal life
West began dating actress Amber Stevens after they met on the television show Greek. They married on December 5, 2014, in Los Angeles. They have two daughters: Ava Laverne, born on October 7, 2018, and Winona Marie, born on July 29, 2021.

Filmography

Films

Television

Other works

References

External links

 

Living people
American male film actors
American male television actors
20th-century American male actors
21st-century American male actors
Male actors from Indiana
People from Merrillville, Indiana
1983 births